Loide António Augusto (born 26 February 2000) is an Angolan footballer who plays as a winger for Portuguese club Mafra and the Angola national football team.

Club career
Born in Luanda, Augusto played youth football for Escola de Futebol do Zango before joining Sporting CP in Portugal in 2018.

On 20 June 2022, Augusto signed a two-year contract with Mafra.

International career
He made his international debut for Angola on 25 March 2021 in a 1–0 defeat away to Gambia.

International goals
Scores and results list Angola's goal tally first.

References

External links
 

2000 births
Living people
Association football wingers
Footballers from Luanda
Angolan footballers
Angola international footballers
Sporting CP B players
S.C. Farense players
C.D. Mafra players
Campeonato de Portugal (league) players
Liga Portugal 2 players
Angolan expatriate footballers
Expatriate footballers in Portugal
Angolan expatriate sportspeople in Portugal